This is a list of American football players who played for the Columbus Tigers in the National Football League (NFL).  It includes players that have played at least one match in the NFL regular season.  The Columbus Tigers franchise was founded in 1901 and lasted until 1926. They were called the Columbus Panhandles until 1923.



A
Dom Albanese

B
Pete Barnum,
Bill Berrehsem,
Jim Bertoglio,
Elliott Bonowitz,
Gale Bullman

C
John Conley

D
Herb Davis,
Earl Duvall

E
Ray Eichenlaub,
Walt Ellis

G
Paul G. Goebel,
Gus Goetz,
Charley Gorrill

H
Neil Halleck,
Ray Hanson,
John Heldt

I
Wilmer Isabel

J
Len Johnson

L
Johnnie Layport,
Frank Lone Star,
Tom Long,
Paul Lynch

M
Joe Mantell,
Tommy Murphy,
Wilkie Moody,
Joe Mulbarger

N
Andy Nemecek,
Frank Nesser,
Ike Nonnemaker

P
Bill Passuello,
Harley Pearce,
Boni Petcoff,
Earl Plank

R
Harry Randolph,
Bob Rapp,
Jim Regan,
George Rohleder,
Homer Ruh

S
Jack Sack,
Herb Schell,
Lou Reichel,
Lee Snoots,
Gus Sonnenberg,
Pete Stinchcomb,
Herb Stock

T
Gus Tebell,
Buddy Tynes

W
Jim Weaver,
Sonny Winters,
Oscar Wolford,
Gerry Woods

References
Databasefootball NFL rosters

Columbus T
Columbus Panhandles